Eerik Kumari Award is an award given since 1989 to those who have excelled in bioscience in Estonia. It is named after Eerik Kumari (1912–1984), who was chairman of the National Conservation Committee of the Estonian Academy of Sciences from 1952 to 1977.

The Eerik Kumari award is currently valued at 5,000 euros, but 30,000 kroons in the past.

Recipients

See also
 List of environmental awards 
 List of biology awards
 List of prizes named after people

References

External links
 Website

Estonian awards
Science and technology in Estonia
Environmental awards
Awards established in 1989
1989 establishments in Estonia